Giambattista Basile (Naples,  – February 1632) was an Italian poet, courtier, and fairy tale collector. His collections include the oldest recorded forms of many well-known (and more obscure) European fairy tales. He is chiefly remembered for writing the collection of Neapolitan fairy tales known as Il Pentamerone.

Biography 
Born in Naples middle-class family, Basile was a soldier and courtier to various Italian princes, including the doge of Venice. In Venice he began to write poetry. Later he returned to Naples to serve as a courtier under the patronage of Don Marino II Caracciolo, prince of Avellino, to whom he dedicated his idyll L’Aretusa (1618). By the time of his death he had reached the rank of "count" Conte di Torrone.

Basile's earliest known literary production is from 1604 in the form of a preface to the Vaiasseide of his friend the Neapolitan writer Giulio Cesare Cortese. The following year his villanella Smorza crudel amore was set to music and in 1608 he published his poem Il Pianto della Vergine.

He is chiefly remembered for writing the collection of Neapolitan fairy tales titled Lo cunto de li cunti overo lo trattenemiento de peccerille (Neapolitan for "The Tale of Tales, or Entertainment for Little Ones"), also known as Il Pentamerone published posthumously in two volumes by his sister Adriana in Naples, Italy in 1634 and 1636 under the pseudonym Gian Alesio Abbatutis. It later became known as the Pentamerone. Although neglected for some time, the work received a great deal of attention after the Brothers Grimm praised it highly as the first national collection of fairy tales. Many of these fairy tales are the oldest known variants in existence. They include the earliest known European versions of Rapunzel and Cinderella with the Chinese version of Cinderella dating from 850–60 AD. Tales of Pentamerone are set in the woods and castles of the Basilicata, in particular the city of Acerenza.

In popular culture 
The 2015 film Tale of Tales is a screen adaptation loosely based on his fairy tale collection.

See also 
 Charles Perrault
 Giovanni Francesco Straparola
 Brothers Grimm

References

Citations

Sources

External links and resources 
 
 
 
 Giambattista Basile in Dizionario biografico degli italiani  
 "La vita di Giambattista Basile"  
 SurLaLune Fairy Tale Pages: Il Pentamerone by Giambattista Basile 
 Illustrations by Warwick Goble 
 Illustrations by George Cruikshank 
 Professor S. Cicciotti's page about G. B. Basile (in Italian)
 Online text of some stories, in English (from Taylor translation) 
 From Court to Forest: Giambattista Basile's "Lo cunto de li cunti" and the Birth of the Literary Fairy Tale, Nancy L. Canepa (Wayne State University Press, 1999)
 Giambattista Basile's "The Tale of Tales, or Entertainment for Little Ones", Translated by Nancy L. Canepa, Illustrated by Carmelo Lettere, Foreword by Jack Zipes (Wayne State University Press, 2007)
 

1583 births
1632 deaths
Neapolitan language
Collectors of fairy tales
Italian Renaissance writers
Italian poets
Italian male poets
16th-century Neapolitan people
People from Giugliano in Campania
Italian children's writers
Italian courtiers
16th-century Italian writers
16th-century male writers
17th-century Italian writers
17th-century Italian male writers
17th-century Neapolitan people
Fabulists